The 18th Central Committee of the Chinese Communist Party was elected by the 18th National Congress on 15 November 2012, and sat in plenary sessions until the communing of the 19th National Congress in 2017. It was formally proceeded by the 17th Central Committee.

The committee is composed of full members and alternate members. A member has voting rights, while an alternate does not. If a full member is removed from the CC the vacancy is then filled by an alternate member at the next committee plenum — the alternate member who received the most confirmation votes in favour is highest on the order of precedence. To be elected to the Central Committee, a candidate must be a party member for at least five years.

The first plenary session in 2012 was responsible for electing the bodies in which the authority of the Central Committee was invested when it was not in session: the Politburo and the Politburo Standing Committee. It was also responsible for approving the members of the Secretariat, Central Commission of Discipline Inspection and its Standing Committee.  The second plenary session in March 2013 was responsible for nominating candidates for state positions.

The remaining plenary sessions of the 18th Central Committee were known for announcing a wide range of reform programs on a scale unprecedented since the Deng era, including "comprehensively deepening reforms", "ruling the country according to law", and complete the construction of a "moderately prosperous society". The 18th CC also saw the highest number of members expelled from the body due to corruption in the party's history.

The 18th CC was elected using the method "more candidates than seats". At the 18th National Congress, delegates could vote for 224 possible candidates for 205 seats for full membership, and 190 candidates for the 171 alternate members. 8.5 percent of the member candidates and 10 percent of the alternate candidates failed to be elected. Of the 373 full and alternate members, 184 of them (i.e., 48.9 percent) were elected to the Central Committee for the first time. Five of the nine members born in the 1960s were associated with the Communist Youth League (designated as Tuanpai by foreign commentators).

Few offspring of previously high-standing officials (known as "princelings") managed to obtain full membership on the 18th CC, though a few were named alternate members. The number of members who worked in central-controlled state-owned enterprises increased from one in the 17th CC to six, while Zhang Ruimin (head of Haier) was re-elected. The number of members from the military remained constant from the previous committee at around 20 percent, continuing a longstanding tradition.

Keys

Plenums

Apparatus

Heads of department-level institutions

Heads of IDUCC institutions

Membership

Members
 Notes
 Name, Ethnicity, Office, Rank and institutional membership are listed in accordance with the Hanzi column, but can be sorted alphabetical by pressing the button next to the column titles.
 The Hanzi column is listed according to the number of strokes in their surnames, which is the official ordering method.
 Ranks listed are the highest rank each individual held during their term; if they were promoted from sub-provincial level to provincial-ministerial level during their term on the Central Committee, they would be listed under a provincial-ministerial level rank; military ranks are listed separately from civilian ranks, with the exception of military officials who hold positions on civilian bodies, in which case both military and civilian ranks are listed
 The Office column lists offices that the individual held during their term on the Central Committee (i.e. between 2012 and 2017) and is not intended to be an exhaustive list of offices they held over the course of their career; if the individual was transferred between different offices, dates are included to indicate the time period they held each office. Generally, offices held between the conclusion of the 18th Party Congress and the National People's Congress in March 2013 are excluded. Dates reflect the term of office only within the duration of the CC session; therefore someone whose term in parentheses indicates 2012–2015, for example, does not necessarily imply that they held the office beginning in 2012; similarly, those whose term ends in 2017 does not necessarily indicate that they relinquished that office in 2017.
Only substantive offices are listed; for example it is customary that an individual will hold office both as provincial party secretary and chair of the provincial People's Congress. In this table, the latter title is not listed.

Alternates 
 Notes
 The individuals below are listed according to the number of votes in favour received at the Party Congress that elected the committee; if the number of votes in favour they received were the same, they are ordered by the number of strokes in their surnames.
 Name (birth–death), Ethnicity, Office, and Rank can be sorted alphabetical by pressing the button next to the column titles.
 Replacement of expelled CC full members
 At each plenum, previously expelled full members of the Central Committee are replaced by alternate members. Alternate members are promoted to full members based on their rank sequence, determined by the number of votes they received at the previous party congress. In October 2017, at the 7th plenum, 11 such replacements were made. However, in a seeming departure from protocol, Liu Xuepu, Zhu Yanfeng, Zheng Qunliang, and Zhao Jin were skipped over from consideration – a possible indication that they had themselves ran afoul of party regulations prior to the plenum.

See also
Provincial Party Standing Committee

Notes

References

Citations

Sources 

 General
Plenary sessions, apparatus heads, ethnicity, the Central Committee member- and alternate membership, Politburo membership, Secretariat membership, Central Military Commission members, Standing Committee of the Central Commission for Discipline Inspection membership, Central Commission for Discipline Inspection, offices an individual held, retirement, if the individual in question is military personnel, female, has been expelled, is currently under investigation or has retired:
 
 
 
 
 
 
  
  
  
  
  
  
   Note: For information on individual members (such as work history, birthdate, or ethnicity), press on their names (which will lead you to a page devoted to that specific individual).
   Note: ''For information on individual members (such as work history, birthdate, or ethnicity), search their name (in Chinese) and you will be transported directly to a page devoted to them.

 Articles and journals
 
 
 

Central Committee of the Chinese Communist Party
2012 establishments in China